The 1952 Latin Cup was the fourth edition of the annual Latin Cup which was played by clubs of the Southwest European nations of France, Italy, Portugal, and Spain. The tournament was hosted by France, and the Spanish club FC Barcelona was the winner of the tournament after defeating OGC Nice by a score of 1–0 in the final match.

Participating teams

Venues 

The host of the tournament was France, and all matches were played in one host stadium.

Tournament

Bracket

Semifinals

Third place match

Final

Goalscorers

References

External links 

 Latin Cup (Full Results) from RSSSF

Latin Cup
International association football competitions hosted by France
June 1952 sports events in Europe